Jeannette Mirsky Ginsburg (September 3, 1903 – March 10, 1987) was an American writer who was awarded a Guggenheim Fellowship in 1947 for her biographical writings on the history of exploration.

Early life and education
Jeannette R. Mirsky was born in Bradley Beach, New Jersey and raised in New York City, the daughter of Michael David Mirsky and Frieda Ettleson Mirsky. Her father was in the garment business. Her brother was Alfred Mirsky (1900-1974), a cell biologist involved in the discovery of DNA. She was a student at the Ethical Culture School, class of 1921. She attended Barnard College, graduating in 1924. She did graduate work in anthropology at Columbia University with Franz Boas and Margaret Mead. She was later awarded an honorary doctorate from Columbia University.

She moved to Princeton, New Jersey in 1950.

Career
Mirsky traveled extensively to access rare papers, maps, and artifacts related to her research. She won a Guggenheim Fellowship in 1947, as well as a Rockefeller Foundation grant and a grant from the National Endowment for the Humanities. She wrote the entry on "Polar Exploration" for the Encyclopedia Americana (1956). Because of her interest in the far north, she was invited to give the keynote lecture at Alaska's Festival of the Arts in 1966.

Works by Jeannette Mirsky
To the North: The Story of Arctic Exploration from the Earliest Times to the Present (1934; later republished as To the Arctic!)
Elisha Kent Kane and the Seafaring Frontier
The Westward Crossings (Balboa, Mackenzie, Lewis & Clark) (US ed. 1946; UK ed. 1951)
Balboa: Discoverer of the Pacific (1964)
Houses of God (1966)
The Gentle Conquistadors (1972)
Sir Aurel Stein, Archaeological Explorer (1977)
The World of Eli Whitney (with Allan Nevins)
The Great Chinese Travelers: An Anthology (1974, edited and wrote introduction)

Personal life
Jeannette Mirsky married engineer Edward Bellamy Ginsburg in 1941. The couple moved to South Carolina for Edward's work, and then to Princeton, New Jersey in 1950. She was widowed in 1959, and died in 1987, at age 83, in Princeton. Her papers are archived at Barnard College.

References

External links
 Northern Chronicle Manuscript at Dartmouth College Library

1903 births
1987 deaths
20th-century American women writers
Barnard College alumni
People from Bradley Beach, New Jersey
People from Princeton, New Jersey